Peter Kevin "Percy" Jones (born 20 October 1946) is a former Australian rules footballer who played for the Carlton Football Club in the Victorian Football League (VFL).

Playing primarily as a ruckman and forward, Jones became known as one of the game's great characters on and off the field. He was a member of four premiership teams for the Blues during one of the most successful eras in the club's history. After a short-lived stint as Carlton coach, Jones ventured into the hotel industry, owning or co-owning several pubs in Melbourne's inner suburbs.

Early life and career
Jones was born at the Queen Alexandra Hospital in Hobart, the second of four children to Kevin and Mollie Jones (née Macleod), At the age of four, he contracted meningitis and was considered fortunate to survive after undergoing spinal tap treatment.

He played first grade football with North Hobart Football Club, and was selected in the Tasmanian State Team in 1965. He was one of the best Tasmanian players in the team that lost to the combined V.F.A. team, 11.10 (76) to 12.11 (83), in the interstate match played at Toorak Park, on Sunday 18 July 1965—he rucked well, and he kicked two goals.

Jones was initially supposed to play with Richmond.

Graeme Richmond, the Secretary at Richmond, who had visited Jones in Tasmania, had given him several gifts, including a suit, in consideration of Jones remaining in Tasmania for the 1966 season and moving to Victoria to play for Richmond in 1967.

Carlton
However, Carlton officials visited him shortly after and  no doubt, in part, driven by a need to replace Maurie Sankey, the 100-games' ruckman and Carlton vice-captain who had died in a car accident in late November 1965  promised that, if he came over to Victoria immediately, they would play him in 1966.

Jones had worked as an apprentice auto electrician in Tasmania. Carlton promised him that, upon his arrival in Melbourne, through the intervention of a rabid Carlton fan in the Accounts Section of the Department's Melbourne organisation, they would be able to arrange for him to appointed to a junior administrative position with the Melbourne office of the Commonwealth Department of Social Services, where Adrian Gallagher (and his uncle Murray) also worked.

Jones had no qualms about moving to Melbourne because his grandmother lived in St Kilda.

Car accident
Jones played well in Carlton's pre-season practice games but was then seriously injured in a car accident. A Carlton supporter offered Jones a ride home to his grandmother in St Kilda, but lost control of the car on Royal Parade and smashed at high speed into a tree.

Jones suffered considerable damage to both his lower legs, with fractures in both of his feet and ankles, as well as sustaining an eye injury. He was unable to resume training until 24 May, and even then was asked to limit his kicking practice. The previous evening, he had also been finally cleared by the Tasmanian Football League to play for Carlton.

He was not fit enough to play his first match for Carlton until Round 16 of that year.

"Percy"
His nickname "Percy" was bestowed upon him by Murray Gallagher, the uncle of his best friend, the rover Adrian Gallagher, after "Percy" the name of the enormous penis that was transplanted onto the injured man in the 1971 film Percy.

Jones was later to capitalise further on this anatomical allusion when he stood as a Liberal Party candidate for election to the Lower House of the Victorian Parliament in the early 1980s, with the slogan "Point Percy at Parliament"

Career at Carlton
At the beginning of his career, he often had to suffer the competitiveness of John Nicholls, who clearly understood Jones' potential. He was often forced (because Nicholls would not "change" with him) to play the major proportion of each match resting in the forward pocket.

Often criticised early on by Ron Barassi for seeking out his best mates "Gags" and Brian Kekovich with his hit-outs and his passes, Jones developed into one of the most talented, exuberant and reliable ruckmen who had ever played for Carlton.

Although he never played well at Glenferrie Oval, he always played brilliantly against Len Thompson at Victoria Park and was, more times than not, best on the ground whenever Carlton played Collingwood at Victoria Park.

In a match against Hawthorn at Moorabbin, Jones is vividly remembered for breaking free from his opponent in the goal-square, running into an open goal, and missing the ball entirely and kicking the goalpost (see ).

He played in six Grand Finals, in two losing teams, in 1969 and 1973 and in four premiership teams 1968, 1970, 1972 (playing perhaps the best game he played in his entire career), and 1979. At the end of the 1979 Grand Final, he was invited onto the dais to hold the premiership cup aloft with captain-coach Alex Jesaulenko

He won Carlton's Best and fairest award, the John Nicholls Medal in 1978, and the Best Clubman Award, the B.J. Deacon Memorial Trophy in 1978.

He played Interstate Football for Victoria in 1977, making him one of a small select group who have played for more than one State.

He was selected in the Tasmanian Team of the Century, as well as the North Hobart Football Club's Team of the Century.

Coaching
In 1980, following the dispute at the end of the 1979, which saw the then Carlton coach Alex Jesaulenko resign in sympathy with the sacking of then Carlton President George Harris, Carlton appointed Jones as senior coach.

Although the team performed well during the regular season in round one of 1980, Jones' first match as senior coach, Carlton soundly beat the highly favoured Collingwood, at Victoria Park 19.18 (132) to 13.16 (94) and reached the semi-finals. However, its performance in the final series was far below of what was required by the club and, so, after interviews were held with Jones, Ron Barassi, and David Parkin, Carlton chose to appoint Parkin in place of Jones. Jones was therefore sacked as Carlton Football Club senior coach after just one season.

Jones held no grudge, and served for many years on the Carlton Committee.

249 games
In 1980, as coach of the senior side, Jones (whose right ankle had been operated on at the end of the 1979 season ) used every persuasive trick that he could muster to convince the Carlton selection panel to allow him to play just one more match, in order for him to reach the 250 game bench-mark. Given his fitness levels at the time – he had continued to play sporadically for the first half of the Reserves matches before resuming his role as senior coach – the most he could have hoped for was to have been picked as 19th or 20th man.

The selection panel refused to allow Jones to play just one more game, even refusing to pick him to play against the team's weakest possible opponent of the season; and many at the time thought that it was somewhat ungracious of the panel to treat such a faithful club servant in such a way – however, those with longer memories of the events of May 1968 (see below), might have understood it in a different way.

Saturday, 11 May 1968
Jones kicked 3 goals in his eleventh senior game – i.e., his fourth senior game in his third senior season with Carlton – in Carlton's 15.10 (100) victory over Hawthorn 11.11 (77) in the round 4 match of the 1968 home-and-away-season.

He sustained an injury to his foot; and, during the following week, he contacted a dose of the 'flu. Due to concerns about whether he was well enough to play an entire senior match, he was omitted from the senior team for round 5, and was selected to play in the Reserves. Along with Ron Auchettl, Jones was one of the best on the ground in the Carlton Reserves' 18.10 (118) to 10.12 (72) victory over Footscray.

In the senior match against Footscray, Ron Barassi had pulled a hamstring, and was expected to be out for at least two weeks; and there was strong speculation that Jones would be selected the following week to replace the injured Barassi.

Saturday, 18 May 1968
Rather unexpectedly, Carlton selected Ron Auchettl rather than Jones in its senior team for round 6, to play the much weaker South Melbourne, and Jones was, once again, selected to play for the Reserves.

The Saturday, 18 May 1968 match against South Melbourne was played at the Lake Oval, located no more than two kilometres from where Jones lived with his grandmother in Cintra Avenue, St Kilda. Jones turned up long after the team arrival deadline of 11:00AM (which gave the players at least 35 minutes to prepare to play at 11:35AM), claiming that he had been grid-locked in a traffic jam along Queens Road, a street that was, in fact, the most direct route between Cintra Avenue and the Lake Oval.

Not only was Jones' explanation rejected, and not only was he accused of lying to the officials, it was also pointed out to him that, if his story was actually true, then he had left his grandmother's house far too late anyway; because, if he had left on time, he would have been easily able to reach the Lake Oval on foot (as the ground was less than 25 minutes walk from Cintra Avenue along either Lakeside Drive or Queens Road).

To make matters even worse for Jones, and the potential acceptance of his fanciful excuses, was the fact that not only was he late, but he had arrived along with one of his Reserves team-mates for the day, the deeply troubled Maffra champion Billy Bennett, who was already showing strong signs of his inability to adjust to life in Melbourne (he went back to Maffra after only playing 11 senior games); and, not only was it already bad enough for both Jones and Bennett, yet another player selected in that side, Graeme Anderson, had failed to arrive in the rooms on time. He had arrived at the ground on time, but had been refused entry by a gate-keeper because he was unable to produce his official V.F.L. Player Pass. The Carlton officials refused to allow the three players to take their place, and all three players were stood down.

Upon being told that he could not play, Jones lost his temper, resigned from Carlton as a player on the spot, and walked out in a huff, and immediately went over, on his own, without either Anderson or Bennett, to the Melbourne Cricket Ground and watched Richmond beat North Melbourne 14.17 (101) to 4.7 (31) with some of his (and Adrian Gallagher's) work-mates, who were standing in the Outer.

This meant, of course, that not only was Jones very conspicuously absent from the sparsely populated Lake Oval (the crowd for the day was 13,420) – and, very obviously, not supporting his Carlton team-mates – he was, at the same time, very conspicuously present at the MCG, was not injured in any way, and was very obviously supporting Richmond.

In the absence of Jones, Bennett, and Anderson, the Carlton Reserves unexpectedly lost to South Melbourne by three goals, 12.15 (87) to 9.15 (69). (Out-played for three of the four-quarters, and no doubt somewhat destabilised by the controversial absence of the three Reserve players from the earlier match, the senior team eventually won a torrid match, 12.11 (83) to 10.11 (71), in which the controversial, and struggling-for-form Eric Sarich had broken Bryan Quirk's jaw in the first quarter.)

Thus, given his apparent blatant breach of discipline in 1968, the decision of the Carlton selectors in 1980 may not have been so harsh after all – especially seeing that he was also coach at the time (1980) and, therefore, it would not look good to make such a concession to the one man who was (by virtue of his position as the team's coach) the major enforcer of team discipline.

Saturday, 25 May 1968
However, by the following Tuesday (the first training session of the week), a very delicate set of negotiations had taken place which allowed Jones to retract his (verbal) resignation, and on Saturday 25 May 1968 (round 7) he was best on the ground in the Carlton team that beat Collingwood 15.11 (101) to 9.13 (67) at Princes Park.

Post football
Married to Jan (née King), and with a daughter Georgia, Jones has spent most of his post-football life running hotels    in inner suburban Melbourne (including "Percy's Bar" in Lygon st, Carlton during the 80's).

After apprenticing as an electrician, Jones decided to enter the hotel business in 1975. A year later, while co-running the Dover Hotel with former teammate Adrian Gallagher, both Jones and Gallagher were placed on a six-month bond due to breaches of the licensing act.

Jones also ran Percy's Bar and Bistro on Lygon Street from 1998 until 2014, when it was announced that he was closing the pub because the landlord wished to develop the site.

His speech impediment also explains why all of Jones' valuable and insightful post-football commentating was conducted through the print media, rather than radio or TV.

References

Bibliography
 
 Jones, P.K. (with Hansen, B.), Percy: The Story of the Carlton Football Club as told by Peter "Percy" Jones, with Brian Hansen (a.k.a. Percy: A Blues Legend), Mount Waverley, Brian Hansen Publications, (Mount Waverley), 1995. 
 Ross, J. (ed), 100 Years of Australian Football 1897–1996: The Complete Story of the AFL, All the Big Stories, All the Great Pictures, All the Champions, Every AFL Season Reported, Viking, (Ringwood), 1996.

External links

Full Points Footy: Peter Jones Profile
Blueseum: Peter Jones Profile
2000: North Hobart's Team of the Century

1946 births
Living people
Australian rules footballers from Hobart
Carlton Football Club players
Carlton Football Club Premiership players
Carlton Football Club coaches
Tasmanian State of Origin players
John Nicholls Medal winners
North Hobart Football Club players
Tasmanian Football Hall of Fame inductees
Four-time VFL/AFL Premiership players